Vyacheslav Skomorokhov (4 October 1940 – 5 November 1992) was a Ukrainian track and field athlete who competed in the 1968 Summer Olympics. He was almost deaf since early childhood and also competed in the Deaf World Games in 1961,1969, 1973 and 1977. He also has won medals at the Deaflympics.

See also 
Deaf people in the Olympics

References

1940 births
1992 deaths
Ukrainian male hurdlers
Deaf competitors in athletics
Ukrainian deaf people
Olympic athletes of the Soviet Union
Athletes (track and field) at the 1968 Summer Olympics
European Athletics Championships medalists
Soviet male hurdlers